Tikove Piira (born 1 April 2000) is a sprinter competing for the Cook Islands. He competed in the men's 100 metres event at the 2019 World Athletics Championships in Doha, Qatar. He competed in the preliminary round and he did not advance to compete in the heats.

Piira is from Pukapuka and was educated at Tereora College. He works as a police officer.

References

External links 
 

Living people
2000 births
People from Pukapuka
Cook Island police officers
Cook Island male sprinters
World Athletics Championships athletes for the Cook Islands